Tosapusia vitiaz is a species of sea snail, a marine gastropod mollusk, in the family Costellariidae, the ribbed miters.

Description
The length of the shell attains 34.3 mm.

Holotype
The holotype of the species (MNHN IM-2013-40624), measured 34.3 mm.

Type Locality : Papua New Guinea, Vitiaz Strait, BIOPAPUA, station DW3719, at a depth of 410 meters.

Distribution

This species occurs in Papua New Guinea.

References

Costellariidae
Gastropods described in 2017